Stefan Marius Johansen (born 8 January 1991) is a Norwegian professional footballer who plays as a central midfielder and captains EFL Championship club Queens Park Rangers. In 2021 he announced that he had retired from international duty with Norway.

Johansen joined Bodø/Glimt at the age of 14. He made his first-team debut in 2007, and transferred to Strømsgodset in 2011 where he was one of the key players in the team that finished second in the league in 2012 and won the league-title in 2013. Johansen won the Kniksen Award as the midfielder of the year in 2013. He transferred to Celtic in January 2014. At Celtic in 2015 he won their player of the year voted for by fans of the club.

Johansen has represented Norway at youth international level, and was a part of the under-21 team at the 2013 European Championship. He made his full international debut in 2013.

Club career

Bodø/Glimt
Johansen was born and raised in Vardø, a small town in the far north of Norway. He moved to Bodø to sign for Bodø/Glimt at the age of 14. He joined the first-team squad along with Anders Ågnes Konradsen ahead of the 2007 season and Johansen made his debut for the team in the First Round of the 2007 Norwegian Football Cup against Hammerfest. Johansen played six matches in Adeccoligaen when Bodø/Glimt was promoted to Tippeligaen in 2007, and made his debut in Tippeligaen in the 3–2 win against Viking on 10 August 2008 when he replaced Jan Derek Sørensen in the 85th minute.

Johansen made four appearances in the 2009 season, going on to play regularly for Bodø/Glimt in Adeccoligaen in 2010 and was regarded as one of the biggest talents in Northern Norway. Clubs like Tromsø, Fredrikstad and Aalesund wanted to sign Johansen whose contract expired after the season, but he signed a three-year contract with Strømsgodset in December 2010, and joined the club on a free transfer on 1 January 2011. Johansen played 18 matches in Adeccoligaen in his final season at Bodø/Glimt.

Strømsgodset
Johansen made his debut for Strømsgodset against in the 2–1 against Sogndal when he came on in the 80th minute and replaced Fredrik Nordkvelle. In his first season at Strømsgodset, Johansen made 13 league appearances and scored one goal. In the match against Sandnes Ulf on 16 May 2012, Johansen scored a goal from a free kick. In the 5–0 win against Fredrikstad on 27 May 2012, Johansen scored another goal from a free kick, identical to the one he scored 11 days earlier. Johansen made his break-through at Strømsgodset after Mohammed Abu returned to Manchester City, when he became a regular in Strømsgodset's starting line-up and was in August 2012 awarded the Statoil Talent Prize for his performances. In 2013, Johansen helped Strømsgodset to win their first league title in 43 years and was voted the Midfielder of the Year in the Norwegian league.

Celtic
On 15 January 2014, Johansen sealed a move to Scottish Premiership club Celtic for a transfer fee of £2 million. Johansen signed a three-and-a-half-year contract with the club, and became the fourth Norwegian to play for Celtic following Harald Brattbakk, Vidar Riseth and Thomas Rogne. He was given the number 25 shirt, the same number worn in previous years by Ľubomír Moravčík and Shunsuke Nakamura.

Johansen made his debut for Celtic in the 4–0 victory against Hibernian on 26 January 2014 when he played the last five minutes as a substitute. He scored his first goal for Celtic on 22 March 2014 in a home league match against St Mirren, opening the scoring in a 3–0 win with a header.

Fulham
Johansen signed a three-year deal with Fulham on 26 August 2016 for an undisclosed fee. Johansen scored his first goal for the club in a 2–2 draw against Norwich City on 18 October 2016.

On 31 January 2019, Johansen joined West Brom on loan until the end of the season.

Queens Park Rangers
On 26 January 2021, Johansen joined Queens Park Rangers on loan until the end of the season. He scored his first goal for QPR in a 2-1 win over Bournemouth on 20 February 2021.

On 24 July 2021, following a successful loan spell, Johansen returned to Queens Park Rangers on a permanent deal, signing a three-year deal for an undisclosed fee.

International career
Johansen made his debut for Norway when he played for the under-15 team against Poland U15 on 8 August 2006. He has later represented Norway at every level up to under-23, and played both matches for the under-21 team when they eliminated France U21 and qualified for the 2013 UEFA European Under-21 Football Championship. Johansen was part of the Norway side which beat England in the European Under-21 Championships before losing to eventual winners Spain at the semi-final stage.

Johansen has thirty-six full international caps for his country, scoring his first international goal on his debut against Sweden in Stockholm on 14 August 2014.

On 22 March 2017, Johansen was appointed as the new captain of Norway, replacing Per Ciljan Skjelbred. On 10 March 2021, Johansen announced that he would retire from international football immediately.

Career statistics

Club

International

Scores and results list Norway's goal tally first, score column indicates score after each Johansen goal.

Honours
Strømsgodset
Eliteserien: 2013

Celtic
Scottish Premiership: 2013–14, 2014–15, 2015–16
Scottish League Cup: 2014–15

Fulham
EFL Championship play-offs: 2018, 2020

Individual
Kniksen Award, Midfielder of the Year: 2013
Gullballen: 2014
PFA Scotland Players' Player of the Year: 2014–15
Celtic Player of the Year: 2014–15

References

1991 births
Living people
People from Vardø
Norwegian footballers
Norway youth international footballers
Norway under-21 international footballers
Norway international footballers
Association football midfielders
FK Bodø/Glimt players
Strømsgodset Toppfotball players
Celtic F.C. players
Fulham F.C. players
Queens Park Rangers F.C. players
West Bromwich Albion F.C. players
Norwegian First Division players
Eliteserien players
Scottish Professional Football League players
Norwegian expatriate footballers
English Football League players
Premier League players
Expatriate footballers in Scotland
Expatriate footballers in England
Norwegian expatriate sportspeople in Scotland
Norwegian expatriate sportspeople in England
Sportspeople from Troms og Finnmark